The discography of American singer-songwriter Ingrid Michaelson consists of eight studio albums, one compilation album, and thirteen official singles. Her two highest charting singles are "The Way I Am" and "Girls Chase Boys" at No. 37 and No. 52 on the Billboard Hot 100, respectively.

Albums

Studio albums

Compilation albums

Extended plays

Singles

Other charted songs

Other appearances

Notes

References

Discographies of American artists